Mr. Roosevelt is an American comedy film written, directed by, and starring Noël Wells, in her directorial debut. It co-stars Nick Thune, Britt Lower, Daniella Pineda, Andre Hyland, Doug Benson, Armen Weitzman, and Sergio Cilli.

The film had its world premiere at South by Southwest on March 12, 2017. It was released on October 27, 2017, by Paladin.

Plot
Emily Martin returns to her hometown to say goodbye to her deceased cat and attempts to come to terms with her past, while staying with her ex-boyfriend and his new girlfriend.

Cast
 Noël Wells as Emily Martin
 Nick Thune as Eric Kline 
 Britt Lower as Celeste Jones
 Daniella Pineda as Jen Morales 
 Andre Hyland as Art
 Doug Benson as Todd
 Armen Weitzman as Andy
 Sergio Cilli as Tom
 Carley Wolf as Samantha

Production
In March 2016, it was announced Noël Wells would write, direct, and star in the film. She plays a struggling comedian in Los Angeles who returns home to Austin, Texas. Production on the film took place in Austin and was shot on 16 mm film. Ryan Miller composed the film's score.  The house she stayed in is at 5010 Duval Street in central Austin.

Release
The film had its world premiere at South by Southwest on March 12, 2017, receiving a standing ovation from the audience in attendance. Shortly after, Paladin and Netflix acquired U.S. distribution rights to the film. It was released on October 27, 2017. On December 26, 2017, the film was released on Netflix.

Reception
On review aggregator Rotten Tomatoes, the film has a 100% rating based on 33 reviews, and the critical consensus is summarized as, "Mr. Roosevelt offers an existential exploration of an entire generation through the microcosm of one woman's relationship with her cat.". On Metacritic, it has an average score of 73 out of 100, based on 13 critical reviews, indicated "generally favorable reviews".

References

External links
 

2017 films
2017 comedy films
2017 directorial debut films
2017 independent films
American comedy films
American independent films
Films about pets
Films set in Austin, Texas
Films shot in Austin, Texas
2010s English-language films
2010s American films